Nicolás Raimondi (born 5 September 1984) is a Uruguayan footballer currently playing as a striker for Deportivo Maldonado.

Career
Raimondi began his professional career playing with his hometown team Liverpool Montevideo, a team where he achieve the promotion to the highest division level of Uruguayan football in 2002.

After three seasons with the team of Montevideo he joined the Chilean side Deportes Antofagasta, club which had just gained the promotion to the Chilean Primera División. After half a season, he comes for the first time to play in Europe and he signed with the Italian side F.B.C. Unione Venezia. At the end of the season the team is in financial trouble, is declared bankrupt and relegated from Serie B.

He returned to his homeland and signed a contract with another team from his hometown Miramar Misiones and played in Uruguay's elite division. After several months, he put his first steps at the highest level in Peru at Atlético Universidad, but when that team was relegated at the end of the season, he returned to the team where he started his career, Liverpool Montevideo in the 2005–2006 season. During the 2006–2007 season, he switched to another townsman and contemporary series, Montevideo Wanderers F.C.

At the end of the season he begins his adventure in the Brazilian modest club Grêmio Esportivo Brasil, which he received the first round of the 2007–2008 season and played during the second round at Avaí FC. The subsequent 2008–2009 season he was transferred to the Bolivian side Club Universitario. With this team he stayed two seasons.

For the second time he embarked on a European challenge. This time at the Cyprus side Ermis Aradippou, after which he returned to Bolivia in 2010 at Club Jorge Wilstermann, where he won the 2010 Apertura.

In August 2010, he signed a new deal with the Bulgarian First Division side PFC Lokomotiv Plovdiv. He was released and later transferred to Liga Adelante club Cartagena. During his first appearance for the team he scored against Recreativo de Huelva immediately with the head the second goal of the 3–1 game home win. On 29 May 2012, he was the first player to extend his contract with the club to face the next Segunda División B season.

Personal life
His favourite music artist is said to be X-Factor finalist, Daniel Evans.
He is nicknamed the Uruguayan "Pericard" due to very similar playing styles and has a tattoo of Leo Sayer on his right arm. He once swallowed a bee during pre-season training.

Honours
Liverpool
2002 Uruguayan Segunda División
Jorge Wilstermann
2010 Apertura

References

External links

BDFA profile

1984 births
Living people
Uruguayan footballers
Uruguayan expatriate footballers
Association football forwards
Liverpool F.C. (Montevideo) players
Venezia F.C. players
Miramar Misiones players
Avaí FC players
Ermis Aradippou FC players
C.D. Antofagasta footballers
PFC Lokomotiv Plovdiv players
FC Cartagena footballers
C.D. Jorge Wilstermann players
Rampla Juniors players
Uruguayan Primera División players
Cypriot First Division players
First Professional Football League (Bulgaria) players
Segunda División players
Segunda División B players
Expatriate footballers in Chile
Expatriate footballers in Bolivia
Expatriate footballers in Brazil
Expatriate footballers in Peru
Expatriate footballers in Cyprus
Expatriate footballers in Bulgaria
Expatriate footballers in Spain
Uruguayan expatriate sportspeople in Spain